Schwaara is a municipality in the district of Greiz, in Thuringia, Germany. The town is member of the municipal association Am Brahmetal.

References

Municipalities in Thuringia
Greiz (district)